Eugene A. Caputo (February 17, 1899 – October 17, 1978) was an American politician and lawyer.

Early life
Eugene A. Caputo was born on February 17, 1899, in Italy. He received his bachelor's degree from University of Pittsburgh and his law degree from University of Pittsburgh Law School.

Career
Caputo practiced Law in Ambridge, Pennsylvania. He served in the Pennsylvania House of Representatives from 1932 to 1938 as a Democrat. He served as a delegate to the Pennsylvania Constitutional Convention of 1967-1968.

Personal life and death
Caputo married Velma Lindway, who worked as an illustrator. They had a daughter, Felisa Vanoff (1925-2014).

Caputo died in Ambridge, Pennsylvania.

References

1899 births
1978 deaths
People from Ambridge, Pennsylvania
Italian emigrants to the United States
University of Pittsburgh alumni
University of Pittsburgh School of Law alumni
Pennsylvania lawyers
Democratic Party members of the Pennsylvania House of Representatives
20th-century American politicians
20th-century American lawyers
American people of Italian descent